Pelli Kanuka is a 1960 Indian Telugu-language romantic drama film, produced by and directed by C. V. Sridhar. It stars Akkineni Nageswara Rao, Krishna Kumari and B. Saroja Devi, with music composed by A. M. Rajah. The film is a remake of Sridhar's own Tamil film Kalyana Parisu (1959). It was released on 29 April 1960, and became a commercial success.

Plot 
Bhaskar and Vasanti are college mates who clash when she complains to the college principal about a love letter he sent her. Later on realizing her mistake, Vasanti apologizes to him and the two fall in love. Vasanti's elder sister, Geeta, supports the family by stitching clothes. Bhaskar rents the room upstairs in their house. He falls ill and in nursing him, Geeta falls in love with him. She confides her love to Vasanti, who decides to sacrifice her love for the sake of her sister and convinces Bhaskar to marry Geeta. Bhaskar initially neglects Geeta. On finding out, Vasanti writes to him that their sacrifice, made for Geeta's happiness, would mean nothing unless he is a good husband to Geeta. Bhaskar relents and Geeta and he have a son. Vasanti joins them and Geeta suspects that there is something going on between Bhaskar and Vasanti and makes Vasanti leave the house. A few years later Geeta, having found out that Bhaskar and Vasanti loved each other, dies in guilt, leaving Bhaskar alone to bring up their child making him promise that he will make Vasanti the child's mother. Bhaskar learns of Vasanti's impending marriage to her former boss Raghu. By the time he reaches there, Vasanti is already married. He hands over his child to Vasanti as a wedding gift and walks away.

Cast 
 Akkineni Nageswara Rao as Bhaskar
 Krishna Kumari as Geeta
 B. Saroja Devi as Vasanti
 Jaggayya  as Raghu
 Gummadi as Raghu's father
 Relangi as Satyam
 Girija as Kantham
 K. Malathi as Geeta's mother
 Master Babu as Raja

Production 
Pelli Kanuka is a remake of C. V. Sridhar's own Tamil film Kalyana Parisu (1959). Akkineni Nageswara Rao, who appeared in a supporting role in that film, portrayed the lead role in this film, while B. Saroja Devi reprised her role.

Soundtrack 
The soundtrack was composed by A. M. Rajah.

Release 
Pelli Kanuka was released on 29 April 1960, and became a commercial success.

References

External links 

1960 films
1960 romantic drama films
1960s Telugu-language films
Films directed by C. V. Sridhar
Films with screenplays by C. V. Sridhar
Indian black-and-white films
Indian romantic drama films
Telugu remakes of Tamil films